Suryaputhri is a Tamil soap opera that aired on Kalaignar TV. The show premiered on 5 March 2012 and aired Monday through Thursday at 10:00PM IST. Later the show was shifted to the 12:30PM and 8:30PM time slot. The show starred Kutty Padmini, Nizhalgal Ravi, Santhoshi, Lavanya, and Rajkumar. It was produced by Vaishnavi Media Works Limited's Kutty Padmini and directed by Tamizh Bharati with Keerthana as the creative director. The music was composed by D. Imman. The show last aired on 19 June 2014 and ended with 448 episodes.

This serial re-telecast on same Channel on only Singapore and Malaysia from December 2016, airs Monday to Friday at 9:30PM.

Cast
Main cast 

 Kutty Padmini
 Nizhalgal Ravi 
 Santhoshi 
 Lavanya as Khirushna 
 Rajkumar 

Additional cast 

 Raja
 A.R.S
 Arya
 Nepal
 Sridevi
 Srivithya
 Deepa
 Suja
 Divya Krishnan

Former cast

 Sudha Chandran

Airing history 
The show started airing on Kalaignar TV on 5 March 2012. It aired on Monday through Thursday at 10PM IST. Later its timing changed, and it was shifted to the 12:30PM and 9:30PM time slot.

References

External links
 

Kalaignar TV television series
2012 Tamil-language television series debuts
Tamil-language television shows
2014 Tamil-language television series endings